Universe Online may refer to:

 Marvel Universe Online, a cancelled multiplayer game by Cryptic Studios
 Universe Online, an in-development multiplayer game by Colony Studios, using the HeroEngine